The East South Central states is a region constituting one of the nine U.S. Census Bureau divisions. It is located within the American South. Four states make up the division: Alabama, Kentucky, Mississippi and Tennessee. The division is one of three that together make up the larger region known as the Southern United States (the other two are the more populous South Atlantic states and the West South Central states).

Historically, the area has been colonized and influenced by the French, Spanish, British, early American, and Confederate governments. Distinct among these states, Alabama's French culture has been preserved through the Alabama Creoles, and Kentucky's French culture can be observed throughout Louisville. The East South Central States form the core of Old Dixie, one of the nine moral regions identified by James Patterson and Peter Kim in their acclaimed 1991 geopolitical best-seller, The Day America Told The Truth. Politically and culturally, the East South Central is more conservative than the other regions making up the American South; Mississippi, Alabama, and Tennessee's governments have been described during 2012 to 2023 as some of the most conservative. Religiously, conservative Evangelical Protestantism dominates the East South Central as a central part of the Bible Belt.

Demographics
As of 2020, the East South Central states had a combined population of 19,430,030. The East South Central region covers 183,401 square miles of land. Within the region, Tennessee is the largest state by population, though Alabama is the largest by land area; Tennessee was also the East South Central's fastest growing state between 2010 and 2020, with Alabama second. Kentucky was the third-fastest growing state, and Mississippi experienced population decline; despite population decline, Mississippi did increase in diversity.

Politics

Bold denotes election winner.

References

Regions of the Southern United States
Census regions of the United States